Saint-Léonard—Anjou (formerly known as Saint-Léonard) was a federal electoral district in Quebec, Canada that was represented in the House of Commons of Canada from 1979 to 1988.

This riding was created in 1976 as "Saint-Léonard" riding from parts of Maisonneuve—Rosemont, Mercier and Saint-Michel ridings. It consisted of the City of Saint-Léonard, the Town of Anjou, and part of the City of Montreal.

The electoral district was abolished in 1987 when it was redistributed into Anjou—Rivière-des-Prairies, Papineau and Saint-Léonard ridings.

Members of Parliament

This riding elected the following Members of Parliament:

Election results

See also 

 List of Canadian federal electoral districts
 Past Canadian electoral districts

External links 
 Riding history for Saint-Léonard from the Library of Parliament
Riding history for Saint-Léonard—Anjou from the Library of Parliament

Former federal electoral districts of Quebec